The Chibcha Terrane (TCH), named after Chibcha, is the largest of the geological provinces (terranes) of Colombia. The terrane, the oldest explored domains of which date to the Meso- to Neoproterozoic, is situated on the North Andes Plate. The megaregional Romeral Fault System forms the contact of the terrane with the Tahamí Terrane. The contact with the Caribbean and La Guajira Terranes is formed by the regional Bucaramanga-Santa Marta Fault. The northeastern boundary is formed by the regional Oca Fault, bounding the La Guajira Terrane. The terrane is emplaced over the Río Negro-Juruena Province of the Amazonian Craton along the megaregional Eastern Frontal Fault System.

Geological Terranes Map of Colombia. Terrane abbreviation is in parenthesis in the legend, followed by a hyphen and age notation. K1: Early Cretaceous, T: Triassic, P: Permian, D: Devonian, C1: Mississippian, MP: Mesoproterozoic, NP: Neoproterozoic, and PP: Paleoproterozoic.

Reinterpretation 
A study performed by Mora Bohórquez et al. in 2017 showed no basement variation between the San Lucas basement underlying the Lower Magdalena Valley (VIM) and the SNSM basement to the east of the Santa Marta Fault. The authors redefined the contacts between the different terranes, using the names Calima Terrane for the coastal portion of the Caribbean Terrane (San Jacinto and Sinú foldbelts) and Tahamí-Panzenú Terrane for the Tahamí Terrane.

Subdivision 

Some authors consider the Garzón Complex a separate terrane; the Andaquí Terrane.

Complexes 
SNSM - Early Eocene
 Santa Marta Batholith
 San Lorenzo
 Socorro
 Bolívar
 Aracataca
 Los Clavos
 Central Batholith
 Río Sevilla
 Latal
 San Lorenzo
 San Pedro de la Sierra
 Río Oríhueca
 Golero
 Los Tábanos
 Atánquez
 Nueva Lucha
 La Piña
 La Caja de Ahorros
 La Paila
 Buritacá

SNSM Paleozoic
 Los Indios-Corual - Lopingian
 Chundúa - Carboniferous (~Moscovian) to Permian (Guadalupian)
 Los Mangos - basement
 Dibuya - Mesoproterozoic (1000 Ma)

Sierra Nevada de Santa Marta (La Guajira Terrane)
 Tanganga (Taganga)
 Rodadero
 Gaira (Gaira)
 Ciénaga

Perijá
 Palmarito - Cisuralian-Guadalupian
 Manaure - Moscovian-Gzhelian
 Río Cachirí
 La Virgen or Guaca - Silurian (Ludlow)
 Perjiá Series - Neoproterozoic basement

Santander - Neoproterozoic-Ordovician
 Tiburón - Lopingian
 Diamante - Artinskian-Guadalupian
 Río Chitagá - Givetian
 San Pedro (formerly 'Silgará Formation')
 Chicamocha (idem)
 Pescadero
 La Corcova
 Bucamanga - basement

Floresta - Cambro-Ordovician
 Chuscales
 Otengá
 Santa Rosita
 Buntia
 Chuscales Phyllite
 Busbanzá
 Neoproterozoic 'Nickerian basement

Quetame
 Farallones - Carboniferous-Devonian
 Guatiquía - Carboniferous (~Gzhelian) to Permian (Guadalupian)
 Clarín-Guacavia - Carboniferous (~Moscovian to Kasimovian)
 Gutiérrez - Eifelian-Givetian
 Puente Quetame, La Balsa - Silurian (Ludlow)
 Quetame Group - Cambro-Ordovician
 Neoproterozoic unnamed basement
 Sombrerillo Quartzmonzodiorite
 Sombrerillo Porphyrics
 Altamira
 Mazamorras

La Macarena - Mesoproterozoic
 Ariarí

San Lucas - Cambrian
 La Cocha-Río Tellez
 Norosí
 Bolívar
 Segovia
 Icarco
 La Magdalena
 San Lucas
 Puente Linda
 El Morro
 La Miel
 Norcasía
 El Hatillo

Southwestern Chibcha
 El Bosque
 Santa Isabel
 Samaná Igneous Complex
 Samaná Alaskite
 San Diego
 Padua
 Anchique
 Dolores

Andaquí Terrane 
Garzón - Neoproterozoic
 Garzón
 Garzón Granite
 Garzón Group
 Florencia Migmatite
 Florencia Stock
 El Recreo
 El Astillero
 Las Minas Monzodiorite
 Las Minas Migmatite
 Ibagué
 Teruel Batholith
 Teruel Quartzmonzodiorite
 San Cayetano
 Tierradentro
 Algeciras
 Caño Veinte
 La Plata
 Guapotón
 Mariquita
 Aleluya
 Cajamarca

Volcanoes 

 Paipa-Iza volcanic complex (Pliocene)
 Nevado del Huila
 Puracé

Ranges 
 Central
 Eastern
 El Cocuy
 Cerros Orientales
 Perijá
 Sierra Nevada de Santa Marta
 San Lucas
 La Macarena

Basins 
 Catatumbo
 Cesar-Ranchería
 Eastern Cordillera
 Altiplano Cundiboyacense
 Bogotá
 Chicamocha
 Middle Magdalena (VMM)
 Upper Magdalena (VSM)

Faults 
bounding faults in bold

 Bucaramanga-Santa Marta (BSF)
 Eastern Frontal (EFS)
 Afiladores
 Algeciras
 Garzón-Pitalito
 Guaicáramo
 Guayuriba
 Mocoa
 San Pedro-Cumaral
 Servitá-Santa María
 Sibundoy
 Suazá
 Yopal
 Boconó
 Oca
 Otú Norte
 La Palestina (LPF)
 Romeral (RFS)
 Bagre Norte
 Bituima-La Salina
 Bogotá
 Caño Tomás
 Chitagá-Pamplona
 Cimitarra
 Cucuana
 La Dina
 Honda
 Ibagué
 Irlanda
 La Macarena
 La Plata
 Suárez
 Tarra
 Usme
 Vianí

Gallery

See also 

 List of earthquakes in Colombia
 List of fossiliferous stratigraphic units in Colombia
 List of mining areas in Colombia
 Geology of the Eastern Hills of Bogotá
 List of Muisca toponyms
 Cocinetas Basin

References

Bibliography

Terranes

Chibcha Terrane

Reports

Maps 
 
 
 
 
 
 
 
 
 
 
 
 
 
 
 
 
 
 
 
 
 
 
 
 
 
 
 
 
 
 
 

Terranes
Geology of Colombia
Neoproterozoic South America
Precambrian South America
Mesoproterozoic geology
Terranes
Terranes
Terranes
Terranes
Terranes
Terranes
Terranes
Terranes
Terranes
Terranes
Terranes
Terranes
Terranes
Terranes
Terranes
Terranes
Terranes
Geology of the Andes
Muysccubun